Marjorie Bransfield is an American former actress.

She appeared in six films with Belushi (marked with an asterisk in the filmography), including a starring role in Abraxas, Guardian of the Universe.  She had a small part in an episode of the TV series Murder One in 1996.

Personal life
Bransfield married actor Jim Belushi in 1990, they divorced in 1992 after two years of marriage.

Filmography

References

External links

American film actresses
Living people
Place of birth missing (living people)
Year of birth missing (living people)
21st-century American women